Roger Avon (23 November 1914 – 21 December 1998) was an English stage, film and television actor born in Jarrow, County Durham.

Some of his television appearances include Hancock's Half Hour, Dad's Army, When the Boat Comes In, Department S, Doctor Who (serials The Crusade and The Daleks' Master Plan), Randall and Hopkirk (Deceased), Our Friends in the North and Blackadder the Third. He appeared in the films Daleks' Invasion Earth 2150 A.D., The Likely Lads, Mutiny on the Buses, Quatermass and the Pit and Curse of the Crimson Altar, among others.

Avon was still acting up until his death, aged 84, his last role being in the TV series Grafters, starring Robson Green.

Selected filmography
 Fun at St. Fanny's (1955) – Horsetrough
 The Time of His Life (1955) – Prison Warder (uncredited)
 Stars in Your Eyes (1957) – Grimes
 The Scamp (1957) – Constable
 Kill Her Gently (1957) – Const. Brown
 The Woman Eater (1958) – Constable
 A Night to Remember (1958) – Lookout Reginald Lee (uncredited)
 Dial 999 (TV series), ('Deadly Blackmail', episode) (1959) - Crime witness (uncredited)
 Dial 999 (TV series) ('Ghost Squad', episode) (1959) - MacTavish
 The Ugly Duckling (1959) – Reporter
 Saturday Night and Sunday Morning (1960) – Policeman at Window Breaking (uncredited)
 The Hellfire Club (1961) – Turnkey
 Murder at the Gallop (1963) – Forensic Photographer (uncredited)
 A Hard Day's Night (1964) – Policeman Following Ringo (uncredited)
 Runaway Railway (1965) – Waterhouse
 Daleks' Invasion Earth 2150 A.D. (1966) – Wells
 Cuckoo Patrol (1967) – Policeman
 Quatermass and the Pit (1967) – Electrician
 Curse of the Crimson Altar (1968) – Sergeant Tyson
 Burke & Hare (1971) – Second Guard
 Mutiny on the Buses (1972) – Policeman (Safari Park)
 Au Pair Girls (1972) – Rathbone
 Hide and Seek (1972) – First workman
 The Likely Lads (1976) – Joe the Landlord
 George and Mildred (1980) – Commissionaire
 The Dresser (1983) – Charles

External links

References

1914 births
1998 deaths
20th-century English male actors
Actors from County Durham
English male stage actors
English male film actors
English male television actors
People from Jarrow
Male actors from Tyne and Wear